The Silent Lover is a 1926 American silent adventure film directed by George Archainbaud and starring Milton Sills, Natalie Kingston and Viola Dana.

Cast
 Milton Sills as Count Pierre Tornal 
 Natalie Kingston as Vera Sherman 
 William Humphrey as Cornelius Sherman 
 Arthur Edmund Carewe as Captain Herault 
 William V. Mong as Kobol 
 Viola Dana as Scadsza 
 Claude King as Contarini 
 Charles Murray as O'Reilly 
 Arthur Stone as Greenbaum 
 Alma Bennett as Haldee 
 Montagu Love as Ben Achmed

References

Bibliography
 Munden, Kenneth White. The American Film Institute Catalog of Motion Pictures Produced in the United States, Part 1. University of California Press, 1997.

External links

1926 films
1926 adventure films
American adventure films
Films directed by George Archainbaud
American silent feature films
First National Pictures films
American black-and-white films
1920s English-language films
1920s American films
Silent adventure films